Learning standards (also called academic standards, content standards and curricula) are elements of declarative, procedural, schematic, and strategic knowledge that, as a body, define the specific content of an educational program.  Standards are usually composed of statements that express what a student knows, can do, or is capable of performing at a certain point in their '''learning progression''' (often designated by "grade", "class level", or its equivalent).

Learning standards have multiple uses in a modern education ecosystem. They can be links to content, and they can be part of a learning pathway or progression.

History in the United States

In the United States, textbooks such as Noah Webster's Speller promulgated specific knowledge to be taught to people at specific ages. Chicago superintendent William Harvey Wells expanded this approach by creating a course of instruction for Chicago Public Schools, which he codified in "A Graded Course of Instruction for Public Schools". Thus, the first learning standards originated as a result of content in textbooks, rather than through a systematic, democratic approach. In 1892, the National Education Association convened the Committee of Ten, which codified the first learning standards designed for a national high school audience. One year later, in 1893, the Committee of Fifteen on Elementary Education was formed to determine a standard number of years for elementary education, establish the content and sequence for elementary grades, and explicate a standardized course of training for elementary school teachers. However, the Committee of Fifteen's work focused primarily on defining the timing, content and teacher training for urban schools. As a result, the National Education Agency further formed the Committee of Twelve on the Rural School Problem and, in 1897, released a report intended to bring about the "...widespread consolidation of American rural schools, [to mirror] the conglomerating urban areas of the country...".

Later in the 20th century, the Core Knowledge Sequence developed by E. D. Hirsch may have contributed to cultural values espoused as learning standards and guides. The Knowledge Sequence provides a sequence for "... specific content (and skills) [to be] taught in English/language arts, history, geography, mathematics, science, and the fine arts"  and had been adopted by some large school districts

At present, learning standards have become an important part of the standards-based education reform movement, in which learning standards are tied directly to rubrics and assessments in many schools; standardized tests are often used for grade-level evaluations within districts and states, and across states; standardized exams are used to graduate students in many US schools.

Usage in other nations

 In Germany the Kultusministerkonferenz (conference of ministers of education) defines, publishes and evaluates standards for different school graduation forms.
 Japan's Ministry of Education, Science, Sports and Culture of Japan manages National Curriculum Standards. These standards define the content for classes in Mathematics, Science, Japanese language, Social Studies, Life Environment Studies, Music, Drawing and Handicraft, Physical Education and Homemaking at the Kindergarten, Elementary, Lower and Upper Secondary levels.
 Singapore utilizes syllabi to "[describe] the primary content expectations for each level through topic lists, which are similar to standards. Details are differentiated for students in different streams, or academic tracks. All students will study content through what is called the O-Level".

Examples

An example of learning standards are state-developed learning standards as described below or the Common Core State Standards (CCSS) developed by the NGA and the  Council of Chief State School Officers (CCSSO).

State learning standards are developed by state boards of education and enforced by state education agencies across the US.

Learning standards are also present at the local level in curriculum published by school districts where they often take the form of guidelines by grade of what a student can or should be able to do, or possibly even activity level learning objectives. These often are based on the state standards but at a finer grain.

Learning standards can also take the form of learning objectives and content-specific standards and controlled vocabulary, as well as metadata about content. There are technical standards for encoding these standards that deal with K-12 learning environments, which are separate from those in higher education and private business.

See also 
 Learning pathway
 Standardized test
 Standards-based education reform in the United States
 U.S. No Child Left Behind Act
 Adequate Yearly Progress

References 

Curricula
Standards-based education